Doug Patterson (born June 13, 1948) is an American politician who served in the Kansas House of Representatives as a Republican from the 28th district from 2001 to 2005.

References

Living people
1948 births
Republican Party members of the Kansas House of Representatives
21st-century American politicians
People from Leawood, Kansas
Politicians from Kansas City, Kansas